Communications Arts High School (commonly Comm Arts or CAHS) is a magnet school in the Northside Independent School District of San Antonio, Texas, United States. The school is consistently rated as one of the top high schools in the nation.  Founded in 1995, it has an enrollment of 100–150 students per class, accepting 150 freshmen per year and 20 sophomores per year. The school is a "school within a school" sharing the campus of William Howard Taft High School with an academic focus on teaching multimedia and communications skills.

Recognition
In 2008 and 2009, it was ranked 26th and 17th in Newsweek magazine's America's Top Public High Schools, respectively. In 2010, the school was ranked 19th in the nation by Newsweek. It has consistently placed the highest of any San Antonio high school on the list since its inception in 2006.

The school has been recognized by the Washington Post as one of the top 100 most challenging high schools in the nation (public or private) since 2011, most recently charting at number 57 in 2017.

In 2011, the school was rated "recognized" by the Texas Education Agency.

Campus
Communications Arts resides within the larger Taft High School campus in the C building. The C building was designed by O'Neill, Conrad, Oppelt Architects and built by Eaton Contracting in 2003. Teachers may elect to hold special classroom activities in the school's outdoor classroom, but students not are allowed to have lunch there due to lack of supervision and weather conditions. Students taking Yearbook or Advanced Video Technology classes have access to a publications lab equipped with iMacs.

Admission
Admission to Communications Arts is open to Bexar County students with at least a C average and requires the submission of an application and the student's choice of an essay or a 5-minute video. Eligible applicants are entered into a lottery system with selected students notified by mail.  Prior to admitting the class of 2005, the admissions process did not operate as a lottery, and admitted students were selected based on the merits of their application. Each year, the school accepts approximately 130 freshmen. As a public school, no tuition is charged to either in-district or out of district students.

Curriculum 
Communications Arts' curriculum focuses especially on communications skills. All students are required to have at least three credits of Spanish or American Sign Language.  Students are also required to take Digital Interactive Multimedia, Media Criticism, Communications Applications (speech), and Independent Study Mentorship classes over their four years, with the option of taking other advanced media classes separate from Taft. These courses include Art 4 Electronic Media (Advanced Video Production), Digital Graphics and Animation, AP Art History, and Yearbook.
 
Additional emphasis is placed on college preparation. All students take the PSAT on campus once a year. All students take Advanced Placement courses, with students being required to take AP Human Geography their freshman year and AP World History their sophomore year. Students also take AP US History, AP English III and IV as well as other AP science and mathematics courses on the Taft campus in their junior and senior years. All AP courses are supplemented with test preparation books including those of companies like Kaplan, Inc which are given to students free of charge in their first semester. All core courses that are not offered as AP (such as World Geography) are offered as Pre-AP courses, though students may elect to take regular versions of the course on the Taft campus. Students who follow the standard curriculum generally graduate with Distinguished Achievement Diplomas.

Students also participate in traditional electives, including fine arts and athletics, with Taft students.

Student activities

Organizations 
Communications Arts student organizations generally operate independently of their Taft counterparts and include a National Honor Society chapter, Student Council, Environment Club, Photography Club, Creative Writing Club, Spanish National Honor Society, PRIDE Club, Fellowship of Faith, an E-Sports club and Helping Hands. All organizations have faculty sponsors, which assist in any fundraising activities like selling food during school events, or after school. Each class has its own organization as well, responsible for raising funds to prepare for senior year activities. The senior class each year is responsible for hosting Commstock as well as Senior Banquet, but some classes may opt for a Senior trip in leu of a banquet.

Events 
The school's small atmosphere and numerous student organizations have fostered many annual events. These include musical events such as Commstock, an event where student bands perform, and Grassroots Cafe, an art house event with a focus on the environment. Additionally, the school hosts two festival style events in its outdoor classroom, Turkeyfest and Earth Day, sponsored by the Student Council and Environment Club, respectively. The Parent Support Group hosts an annual family picnic called CAHS in the Parking Lot. These events are generally fundraisers for the organizations that sponsor them.

Publications 
The school's focus on communications pursuits fosters many student produced publications. These include weekly video announcements and an annual recruitment video, produced by the Advanced Video Technology class. The school produces its own yearbook as well, under the title Unity. Students also publish a Spanish language campus e-paper under the title La Communidad.

References

External links
 

High schools in San Antonio
Educational institutions established in 1995
1995 establishments in Texas
Public high schools in Bexar County, Texas
Northside Independent School District high schools
Magnet schools in Texas